Annals of Operations Research is a peer-reviewed academic journal published by Springer Science+Business Media. It was previously published by Baltzer Science Publishers. The journal publishes 24 issues a year that focus on the theoretical, practical, and computational aspects of operations research. It also publishes periodic special volumes focusing on defined fields of operations research.

Editors-in-chief
The following is a list of persons that have been editor-in-chief of The Annals of Operations Research.
 Peter L. Hammer
 Endre Boros

Abstracting and indexing 
Annals of Operations Research is abstracted and indexed in DBLP, Journal Citation Reports, Mathematical Reviews, Research Papers in Economics, SCImago Journal Rank, Scopus, Science Citation Index, Zentralblatt MATH, among others. 
According to the Journal Citation Reports, the journal has a 2020 impact factor of 4.854.

External links

References 

Business and management journals
Publications established in 1984
Springer Science+Business Media academic journals
English-language journals